The Shadow Cabinet of Mmusi Maimane was formed on 5 June 2014 in South Africa following his election as Parliamentary Leader of the Democratic Alliance and Leader of the Opposition on 29 May 2014. The Democratic Alliance parliamentary caucus also elected other caucus leadership. John Steenhuisen was elected Chief Whip with Anchen Dreyer as Caucus Chairperson. These elections all occurred following the 2014 general elections, in which the Democratic Alliance retained its post as the Official Opposition in the National Assembly of South Africa.

The shadow cabinet has been reshuffled on various occasions. The first reshuffle occurred in October 2015, when Member of Parliament, Dianne Kohler Barnard, was demoted from her position due to her publishing a controversial Facebook post. The next occurred in November 2016, in the aftermath of the party's parliamentary mid-term caucus elections. The shadow cabinet was reshuffled for the third time in July 2017, following the departure of Wilmot James.

Following the 2019 general elections, the Democratic Alliance remained the Official Opposition and the party subsequently held parliamentary caucus elections. Maimane returned to the position of Leader of the Opposition with John Steenhuisen as Chief Whip. Annelie Lotriet was elected Chairperson of the Caucus. Maimane announced the new shadow cabinet on 5 June 2019.

Maimane resigned as parliamentary leader of the DA on 24 October 2019, though the current shadow cabinet had been retained by acting parliamentary leader Annelie Lotriet. John Steenhuisen has since been elected parliamentary leader and he announced his shadow cabinet in December 2020.

Formation
Mmusi Maimane was elected unopposed as the parliamentary leader of the Democratic Alliance and Leader of the Opposition in the National Assembly of South Africa on 29 May 2014, effectively becoming the party's second black parliamentary leader, following the retirement of Lindiwe Mazibuko. Although the media speculated that Democratic Alliance Federal Leader Helen Zille would run for the post, she opted to remain Premier of the Western Cape.

Alongside the election for parliamentary leader, other party caucus leadership elections were also held. John Steenhuisen was elected chief whip, succeeding party veteran Watty Watson. Sandy Kalyan and Michael Waters were both nominated for the post of deputy chief whip. Waters inevitably defeated Kalyan. Several whips were also elected. Anchen Dreyer and Richard Majola contested the election for the post of caucus chairperson. Dreyer was elected caucus chairperson with Majola as Deputy Caucus Chairperson. Elza van Lingen secured a second term as the party's leader in the National Council of Provinces, while Cathlene Labuschagne was named the party's whip in the NCOP.

On 5 June 2014, Maimane announced the composition of his shadow cabinet. Upon the announcement, he said, "This shadow cabinet will make pragmatic legislative proposals that will tackle South Africa's problems head-on, with a commitment to the creation of real jobs in South Africa."

Membership

2014–2019

Members of the Shadow Cabinet
Democratic Alliance leader Mmusi Maimane announced the latest changes to the Shadow Cabinet on 1 June 2017.

Shadow Ministers in Standing Committees in the National Assembly of South Africa

Parliamentary Caucus Leadership
Parliamentary leadership team following internal caucus elections on 29 May 2014.

2019

Members of the Shadow Cabinet
The following table depicted the composition of the  shadow cabinet announced on 5 June 2019.

Shadow Ministers in Standing Committees in the National Assembly

Parliamentary Caucus Leadership
Parliamentary leadership team following internal caucus elections on 30 May 2019.

References 

South African shadow cabinets
Democratic Alliance (South Africa)